John Griffiths of Erryd (28 October 1754 – 17 September 1822) was a London medical practitioner and surgeon. His parents were the Reverend John Griffiths, B.A. from Oxford University, and Mary Denham.

Career
Dr Griffiths was appointed surgeon to Queen Charlotte's Household on 23 November 1792, which position he held until 1818, and was surgeon at St George's Hospital (1796 – 1822).

Griffiths was among those who gave evidence to the 1802  Committee of the House of Commons on Dr JENNER'S Petition respecting his Discovery of Vaccine Inoculation against small pox, recently discovered by Edward Jenner. In his evidence, Griffiths indicated that he had inoculated upward to fifteen hundred persons, none of whom has had untoward symptoms, among them three of his own children, at various periods within three years.

Marriage, family and death
Griffiths married Elizabeth, the daughter of Sir William Neville Hart M.P. and Elizabeth Aspinwall, on 4 June 1787 and had issue. Griffiths died on 17 September 1822 and his wife Elizabeth on 16 April 1824. He died in Charmouth, Dorset, where they are both buried in the graveyard of St Andrew's Parish Church. He was the elder brother of Lieutenant-General Charles Griffiths. His younger brother's wife, Caroline, was the sister of his own wife. Griffiths and his wife, Elizabeth, were the parents of George Richard Griffiths and the grandparents of George Neville Griffiths M.L.A (New South Wales). The latter was the grandfather of Wiliam Charles Wentworth IV M.P (Australia).

References

18th-century British medical doctors
19th-century British medical doctors
British surgeons
1754 births
1822 deaths
Members of the British Royal Household